William McDougall,  (1831 – March 3, 1886) was a lawyer, judge and political figure in Quebec, Canada. He represented Three Rivers in the House of Commons of Canada from 1868 to 1878 as a Conservative member.

He was born in Scotland in 1831, the son of John McDougall, and came to Lower Canada with his family while still young. He studied law and was called to the bar in 1851. McDougall was elected to the federal parliament by acclamation in an 1868 by-election after the sitting member resigned. In 1873, he became a Queen's Counsel. He was a director of the Phillipsburgh, Farnham and Yamaska Railway. He resigned his seat in 1878 to allow Hector-Louis Langevin to have a seat in the House of Commons.

In 1880, he was named to the Quebec Superior Court for Ottawa district. He died in Aylmer in 1886.

His daughter Alice married James Klock who also later served in the House of Commons.

External links
 
The Canadian parliamentary companion and annual register, 1877, CH Mackintosh 
Les juges de la province de Québec, PG Roy (1933)

1831 births
1886 deaths
Conservative Party of Canada (1867–1942) MPs
Members of the House of Commons of Canada from Quebec
Judges in Quebec
Scottish emigrants to pre-Confederation Quebec
Canadian King's Counsel
Immigrants to Lower Canada